Otru (Tamil: ஒற்று) is a 2021 Indian Tamil drama thriller film written and directed by Mathivanan Sakthivel. The film features music composed by S. P. Venkatesh, and editing by Suresh Urs.

Plot 
The hero, Indran (Mathivanan Sakthivel) is a writer who meets a blind girl, Pramila (Mahashri). Indran uses the issues that Pramila have as a plot for his novel. In this journey he explores some thrilling events.

Cast

Production 
The film is produced by Sakthi Screens and it is written and directed by Mathivanan Sakthivel.

Reception 
CinemaInbox appreciated Mathivanan Sakthivel's and Mahashri's performance in the movie. It reviewed that Mathivanan Sakthivel was very natural in his acting as a novel writer and  Mahashri  performed the strong character as a blind girl very easily portraying as a real blind girl. The movie has lots of suspense in the search for unanswered thoughts and questions, tempting the audience to expect what comes next in the movie. The main drawbacks of the movie relates to the fact there were lots of new casts in the movie and the story revolving around similar locations.

Tamil2day News commented that a nice story has been filmed with a very small budget. Mathivanan Sakthivel's acting was extraordinary, especially his acting on sad scenes are  exemplary. Mahashri's acting does not show that this is her first movie, she has acted as an experienced actress.

In her review Malini Mannath, said that the director has given a thriller like knot with couple of twists and turns. The knot has potential to be a better  thriller, however the screen play has failed with too many issues pushed in the script. Mathivanan Sakthivel looks suitable for his role as a writer and Mahashri has done a fairly competent job as the blind girl. Mathivanan should be appreciated for not turning Mahashri's character as a stereotype.

Accolades

References

External links
 
 
 

2021 films
2021 drama films
Films about women in India
Films about disability in India
Films shot in Chennai